The 2021–22 Azadegan League is the 31st season of the Azadegan League and 21st as the second highest division since its establishment in 1991. The season will start on 11 October 2021 with 13 teams from the 2020–21 Azadegan League, two new teams relegated from the 2020–21 Persian Gulf Pro League: Saipa and Machine Sazi and three new teams promoted from the 2020–21 League 2: Mes Shahr-e Babak, Shahrdari Hamedan and Vista Toorbin Tehran as champion, runner-up and third placed team respectively.

Teams

Stadia and locations

Number of teams by region

League table

Results

Positions by round

See also
 2021–22 Persian Gulf Pro League
 2021–22 2nd Division
 2021–22 3rd Division
 2021-22 Hazfi Cup
 2021 Iranian Super Cup

References

Azadegan League seasons